In linear algebra, particularly projective geometry, a semilinear map between vector spaces V and W over a field K is a function that is a linear map "up to a twist", hence semi-linear, where "twist" means "field automorphism of K". Explicitly, it is a function  that is:
 additive with respect to vector addition: 
 there exists a field automorphism θ of K such that , where  is the image of the scalar  under the automorphism. If such an automorphism exists and T is nonzero, it is unique, and T is called θ-semilinear.

Where the domain and codomain are the same space (i.e. ), it may be termed a semilinear transformation.  The invertible semilinear transforms of a given vector space V (for all choices of field automorphism) form a group, called the general semilinear group and denoted  by analogy with and extending the general linear group. The special case where the field is the complex numbers  and the automorphism is complex conjugation, a semilinear map is called an antilinear map. 

Similar notation (replacing Latin characters with Greek) are used for semilinear analogs of more restricted linear transform; formally, the semidirect product of a linear group with the Galois group of field automorphism. For example, PΣU is used for the semilinear analogs of the projective special unitary group PSU.  Note however, that it is only recently noticed that these generalized semilinear groups are not well-defined, as pointed out in  – isomorphic classical groups G and H (subgroups of SL) may have non-isomorphic semilinear extensions. At the level of semidirect products, this corresponds to different actions of the Galois group on a given abstract group, a semidirect product depending on two groups and an action. If the extension is non-unique, there are exactly two semilinear extensions; for example, symplectic groups have a unique semilinear extension, while  has two extensions if n is even and q is odd, and likewise for PSU.

Definition 
 
 

However, a map that is -semilinear for a distinct embedding  will not be K-linear with respect to the original identification , unless  is identically zero.

 
 
The term semilinear applies for any combination of left and right modules with suitable adjustment of the above expressions, with  being a homomorphism as needed.

The pair  is referred to as a dimorphism.

Related

Transpose

Let  be a ring isomorphism,  a right -module and  a right -module, and  a -semilinear map.

This is a -semilinear map.

Properties

Let  be a ring isomorphism,  a right -module and  a right -module, and  a -semilinear map.  The mapping

defines an -linear form.

Examples 

 Let  with standard basis . Define the map  by
 
f is semilinear (with respect to the complex conjugation field automorphism) but not linear.
 Let  – the Galois field of order , p the characteristic. Let . By the Freshman's dream it is known that this is a field automorphism. To every linear map  between vector spaces V and W over K we can establish a -semilinear map

Indeed every linear map can be converted into a semilinear map in such a way. This is part of a general observation collected into the following result.
Thus, the homothety  need not be a linear map, but is -semilinear.

General semilinear group 
Given a vector space V, the set of all invertible semilinear transformations  (over all field automorphisms) is the group ΓL(V).

Given a vector space V over K, ΓL(V) decomposes as the semidirect product
 
where Aut(K) is the automorphisms of K. Similarly, semilinear transforms of other linear groups can be defined as the semidirect product with the automorphism group, or more intrinsically as the group of semilinear maps of a vector space preserving some properties.

We identify Aut(K) with a subgroup of ΓL(V) by fixing a basis B for V and defining the semilinear maps:

for any . We shall denoted this subgroup by Aut(K)B. We also see these complements to GL(V) in ΓL(V) are acted on regularly by GL(V) as they correspond to a change of basis.

Proof 
Every linear map is semilinear, thus . Fix a basis B of V. Now given any semilinear map f with respect to a field automorphism , then define  by

As f(B) is also a basis of V, it follows that g is simply a basis exchange of V and so linear and invertible: .

Set . For every  in V,
 
thus h is in the Aut(K) subgroup relative to the fixed basis B. This factorization is unique to the fixed basis B. Furthermore, GL(V) is normalized by the action of Aut(K)B, so .

Applications

Projective geometry 
The  groups extend the typical classical groups in GL(V). The importance in considering such maps follows from the consideration of projective geometry.

The projective geometry of a vector space V, denoted PG(V), is the lattice of all subspaces of V. Although the typical semilinear map is not a linear map, it does follow that every semilinear map  induces an order-preserving map . That is, every semilinear map induces a projectivity. The converse of this observation (except for the projective line) is the fundamental theorem of projective geometry. Thus semilinear maps are useful because they define the automorphism group of the projective geometry of a vector space.

Mathieu group 

The group PΓL(3,4) can be used to construct the Mathieu group M24, which is one of the sporadic simple groups; PΓL(3,4) is a maximal subgroup of M24, and there are many ways to extend it to the full Mathieu group.

See also 

 Antilinear map
 Complex conjugate vector space

References 

 
  
 
 
 
  

Functions and mappings
Linear algebra
Linear operators
Projective geometry